Gordon Stanfield Animation (GSA) is an animation service and creator company based in Vancouver, British Columbia with 30 years of development, pre-production and production experience. GSA was the first digital studio in western Canada and is active with various animated productions.

External links

Canadian animation studios